WHNJ is a Christian radio station licensed to Big Pine Key, Florida, broadcasting on 95.7 MHz FM.  WHNJ is owned by Multicare Foundation, Inc.

References

External links
WHNJ's website

HNJ